is a Japanese convenience store franchise chain. It is Japan's second largest convenience store chain, behind 7-Eleven. There are now 24,574 stores worldwide in Japan, Taiwan, China, Philippines, Thailand, Vietnam, South Korea,Indonesia, and Malaysia. Its headquarters is on the 17th floor of the Sunshine 60 building in Ikebukuro, Toshima, Tokyo. There are some stores in Japan with the name Circle K Sunkus under the operation of FamilyMart.

FamilyMart was, until 2020, a subsidiary of the FamilyMart UNY Holdings Co., Ltd. (UFHD), which also owned supermarket chain Uny. UFHD was dissolved when Uny was acquired by the parent company of Don Quijote in 2020. FamilyMart Co.'s parent company is Itochu, a Japanese trading company, with a stake of 50.1%. On July 8, 2020, Itochu announced it will spend approximately ¥580 billion (approx $5.5 billion) to purchase 100% of FamilyMart, with the intent to sell 4.9% of the shares to Zen-Noh and Norinchukin Bank. FamilyMart shareholders approved the takeover on October 26, and the stock was delisted on November 12, thus leading the completion of the acquisition.

All of the usual Japanese convenience store goods such as basic grocery items, magazines, manga, soft drinks, alcoholic drinks like sake, nikuman, fried chicken, onigiri, and bento are available. FamilyMart is known for its distinctive doorbell melody, which is played upon entering the store. The doorbells are exclusively made by Panasonic, and the melody these doorbells play is referred to as Melody Chime No.1 – Daiseikyou, and was originally developed for Panasonic by Yasuhi Inada in 1978.

Growth and development

The first FamilyMart opened in Sayama, Saitama Prefecture in 1973.

The store has kept growing, opening 500 stores every 3 years. In 2002, it was listed as a company in Taiwan.

FamilyMart currently has franchise stores in Malaysia, Philippines, Thailand, Indonesia, Taiwan, China, and Vietnam.

In October 2013, FamilyMart opened its 10,000th store in Japan. Operations in certain parts of Asia, especially China, continue to expand.

As of January 2018, there are 24,243 stores worldwide, with fast growth in Asia outside Japan. There are 17,409 stores in Japan, 3,165 stores in Taiwan, 2,177 stores in China, 1,138 stores in Thailand, 277 stores in Malaysia, 66 stores in the Philippines, 165 stores in Vietnam, and 87 stores in Indonesia, 
FamilyMart has stores located in all prefectures of Japan.

FamilyMart was formerly the largest chain store in South Korea. FamilyMart entered South Korea in 1990 through a franchise licensing agreement with Bokwang Group. However, from 2012, the original stores were rebranded as CU and operated separately by BGF Retail (then a joint venture between FamilyMart and Bokwang Group). In 2014, FamilyMart sold off their stake in BGF Retail after its IPO and divested from South Korea as a result of the rebranding exercise.

International operations

China mainland

FamilyMart opened its first store in Shanghai, China in 2004. Since then, the chain has expanded to Guangzhou, Suzhou and Hangzhou. Other stores are in Shenzhen, Guangzhou, Chengdu, Wuxi, Beijing and Dongguan. By December 2020, there are over 2,967 FamilyMart stores in mainland China.

Malaysia 

FamilyMart opened its first store in Malaysia at Wisma Lim Foo Yong in Bukit Bintang, Kuala Lumpur on November 11, 2016. It has become popular because it is the first convenience store selling soft serve ice cream and fresh snacks.

FamilyMart Malaysia are owned by Maxincome Resources Sdn Bhd which is one of QL Resources Bhd subsidiary. They had a 20-year agreement with FamilyMart Co Ltd.

All of FamilyMart Malaysia's food service and ready-to-eat selections are made with halal ingredients only. The service is currently in the midst of the halal application process with JAKIM. The products available in FamilyMart that are Halal certified will carry the Halal logo on its packaging. For products that are imported from Japan, Korea or Taiwan, the product ingredients will be vetted to ensure that no haram ingredients such as pork, lard or alcoholic substance were used. Customers will be able to read the ingredients information on the food or drinks packaging before purchase to ensure hassle-free consuming. In April 2019, FamilyMart Malaysia was one of the F&B outlets that was chosen by PLUS Malaysia Berhad, the largest expressway in Malaysia to set up their stores in one of the R&R areas.

As of 6 May 2021, there are 242 stores nationwide, marking the 200th store milestone on the first store in Penang after its 100th store in Melaka. By 2022, they planned to open 300 stores nationwide.

Philippines
FamilyMart was launched in the Philippines on April 7, 2013 under the ownership of Ayala Corporation, Rustan's Group and Itochu. Philippine FamilyMart CVS Inc. is the official Philippine franchisee of FamilyMart. Its first Philippine branch, opened on April 22, 2013, is located at the Glorietta 3 mall in Makati. In 2017, Phoenix Petroleum Philippines, Inc., a unit of the Davao-based conglomerate Udenna Corporation, acquired the franchise from the triumvirate; it was completed in 2018. There are now more than 65 stores in the Philippines, including those built at select Phoenix Petroleum stations.

Taiwan 
In 1988, FamilyMart began opening stores in Taiwan. 
In May 2012, there were around 9,255 convenience stores in Taiwan, which was equivalent to one store per 2,500 people. This is the highest number per capita in the world, and the number is still rising. 7-Eleven is the most popular convenience store in Taiwan, while FamilyMart is the second.
 
FamilyMart sued to end its partnership with Ting Hsin in 2019, which would end a 15-year joint venture. Ting Hsin International Group was the top seller of instant noodles in the world in 2017, with a 15% share of the market.

As of January 2018, FamilyMart has a total of 3,165 stores in Taiwan and accepts the highest number of bill payments among convenience stores in Taiwan, with over 100 million bills paid per year.

As of October 2021, there was more than 3,600 FamilyMart stores located in Taiwan.

Thailand 
FamilyMart opened its first store in 1993 and grew to over 1,000 locations within the next decades. In May 2020, FamilyMart transferred their 49% stake of the Thai joint venture to partner Central Group. Despite FamilyMart's effective exit from the venture, they maintained licensing rights and store locations retained the company's name.

Vietnam
FamilyMart opened its first store in Vietnam in 2009, starting in Ho Chi Minh City. Initially the stores were operated in a joint venture with Vietnamese distributor Phu Thai Group, after 2013, both companies went their own way, and Phu Thai Group took over a number of FamilyMart stores and started operating them under its own brand B's Mart. As of 2017, FamilyMart operated 130 stores in Ho Chi Minh City.

Former

Korea

At the end of May 2012, the number of operating FamilyMart stores had reached 7,271. In June 2012, FamilyMart of South Korea, which was being run by FamilyMart Corporation and BGF Retail, was renamed and converted to 'CU' under ownership of BGF Retail after an order coming from BGF Retail that required FamilyMart to leave the South Korean market, and to cease operations there. At the end of March 2014, FamilyMart withdrew from the South Korean market completely. The stores are now called CU. The motto is "Convenience for you".

In addition, South Korean franchisees had operated a number of stores at Kaesong Industrial Region and Mount Kumgang Tourist Region in North Korea for South Korean visitors and workers; all the stores are now closed.

United States

Beginning in July 2005, FamilyMart began building and opening several stores in Los Angeles, California, the first of 250 planned for the United States by 2009. The North American brand name is "Famima!!".

In November 2010, FamilyMart announced it would freeze the number of locations in the United States to 10 stores due to the difficult economic environment.

In October 2015, FamilyMart closed all eight of its Famima!! convenience stores in the United States and liquidated Famima Corp. USA, withdrawing from the United States.

Solar power
FamilyMart has had solar power at some of its stores since at least 2004. It aims to increase its solar energy footprint in the future. There are around 45,000 convenience stores in Japan. Lawson run just under 10,000, a market share just behind 7-Eleven, who have about 13,000 stores. Currently, only 20 of Lawson's stores are equipped with solar equipment, but they plan to expand that number ahead of the 1 July 2012 introduction of a "feed-in tariff system", which the government and electricity companies say guarantees purchases of electricity from renewable sources such as solar or wind generators. Surplus power can be sold only after in-store lighting and air-conditioning have been powered.

Automatic cashiers

On 30 January 2006, FamilyMart began trials of an automatic cashier station at one of its Tokyo stores in cooperation with Itochu and Toshiba. Special tags on items in the customer's shopping basket are remotely and instantly sensed at the register.

Controversy

Labor Commission case by franchise owners
Seventeen convenience store owners of FamilyMart stores formed a union and requested collective bargaining with the company. They were refused and sued. In April 2015 the Central Labor Commission of Japan found that FamilyMart had violated the Trade Union Law by refusing to negotiate with the union. The franchise owners were recognized as employees under the trade union law, and the company was ordered to pledge to the union that it would not repeat the offence.

Rat infestation incident 
In August 2019, footage emerged of as many as six rats scurrying through a FamilyMart store in Shibuya, near sushi displays and down aisles. FamilyMart responded by shutting the store, in order to investigate the cause of the problem, and apologised if the "unsanitary" footage had made customers feel "uneasy".

See also 
 List of convenience stores

References

External links

  
  
  (in Vietnamese)

Itochu
Convenience stores of Japan
Convenience stores of the Philippines
Japanese brands
Japanese companies established in 1981
Retail companies based in Tokyo
Retail companies established in 1981
1980s initial public offerings
2020 mergers and acquisitions
Companies formerly listed on the Tokyo Stock Exchange